Francis Godfroy Cemetery is a historic cemetery located in Butler Township, Miami County, Indiana.  The cemetery was established in 1812 on the site of a Miami Nation village and Chief Francis Godfroys council chambers.

It was listed on the National Register of Historic Places in 1984.

References

External links
 

Cemeteries on the National Register of Historic Places in Indiana
1812 establishments in Indiana Territory
Buildings and structures in Miami County, Indiana
National Register of Historic Places in Miami County, Indiana